The women's 800 metres event at the 1975 Summer Universiade was held at the Stadio Olimpico in Rome with the final on 21 September.

Medalists

Results

Heats

Final

References

Athletics at the 1975 Summer Universiade
1975